Kannywood Awards is an annual film event presented by Kannywood Guild of Actors honouring outstanding achievement in the Kannywood Movie Industry. It was first held in 2014, in Kano State. The 2015 Kannywood Awards, honouring movies of 2014, was held at NAF Conference Center, Abuja, FCT, on January 31, 2015. Emir of Gumel from Jigawa State, Ahmad Muhammad Sani was the chief host.

Ceremonies 
 2014 Kannywood Awards
 2015 Kannywood Awards

Categories 
As of 2014, Kannywood Awards have approximately 21 categories which are listed below.

POPULAR CHOICE AWARD
 Best Actor
 Best Actress
 Best Director
 Best Comedian
JURORS AWARD
 Best Film
 Best Actor
 Best Actress
 Best Director
 Best Supporting Actor
 Best Supporting Actress
 Best Comedian
 Best Cinematography

 Best Villain
 Best Costume
 Best Make-Up
 Best Script
 Best Child Actor
 Best Set Design
 Best Music
 Best Visual Effect
 Best Sound
 Best Editor:

References 

 
2014 establishments in Nigeria
Nigerian film awards
Awards established in 2014
Entertainment events in Nigeria